Lawrence Joseph Fuller (20 December 1914 – 19 August 1998) was an American army major general who served as the deputy director of the Defense Intelligence Agency.

Early life
Fuller was born in Everett, Washington, and raised in Grand Rapids, Michigan, where he attended Grand Rapids Junior College.  He graduated from the U.S. Military Academy in 1940.  He also graduated from the University of Michigan, from George Washington University, and from Stanford University.

Military career
During World War II, Fuller served in the Pacific and with the 3rd Army in Europe.  He was the Deputy Judge Advocate General of the United States Army from 1967 to 1971. He is the recipient of two Army Distinguished Service Medals and one Legion of Merit.

Post-military life
He lived in the Washington, D.C. area from 1959 until 1994, when he moved from Great Falls to Baltimore.  He died of a heart attack on 19 August 1998.

References

Deputy Directors of the Defense Intelligence Agency
United States Army generals
Recipients of the Distinguished Service Medal (US Army)
Recipients of the Legion of Merit
Military personnel from Michigan
United States Military Academy alumni
University of Michigan alumni
George Washington University alumni
Stanford University alumni
1914 births
1998 deaths
Grand Rapids Community College alumni